Gregg Baker is an American football coach. He is an assistant football coach at Wetumpka High School in Wetumpka, Alabama. Baker served as was the head football coach at Faulkner University in Montgomery, Alabama from 2009 to 2011, compiling a record of 9–23. He resigned in November 2011 and was succeeded by Faulkner athletic director Brent Barker. Baker joined the football coaching staff at Faulker in 2008 as running game coordinator and offensive line coach.

Head coaching record

College

References

Year of birth missing (living people)
Living people
Faulkner Eagles football coaches
High school football coaches in Alabama